The New Cut is an artificial waterway which was constructed between 1804 and 1809 to divert the tidal river Avon through south and east Bristol, England. This was part of the process of constructing Bristol's Floating Harbour, under the supervision of engineer William Jessop. The cut runs from Totterdown Basin at the eastern end of St Phillip's Marsh, near Temple Meads, to the Underfall sluices at Rownham in Hotwells and rejoining the original course of the tidal Avon.

No ships have navigated the cut on a regular basis since the 1930s, but it is still possible for boats to proceed as far as Netham weir with care.

Construction

The Bristol Docks Company was formed to construct the Floating Harbour following the passage of an Act of Parliament in 1803, sponsored by the City Corporation and the Merchant Venturers. The engineer William Jessop had originally proposed a smaller scheme, which would have involved a shorter cut from Prince Street, near the city centre, to Rownham. However this would have meant that ship owners could have avoided using the new Floating Harbour and the scheme was amended to include a greater area of the river Avon, thus necessitating the longer cut which is in existence today.
 
Work commenced on the construction on 1 May 1804 at 5am at a ceremony conducted by the directors of the Bristol Docks Company. Excavation was made through the predominant Redcliffe Sandstone, a Triassic rock that can be seen in cuttings all along the New Cut. There is a persistent local myth that the labour force included French prisoners of war, but there is no evidence to support this.

A report to the company stated that in the first year of excavation   of earth and rock had been removed at a cost of £120,138 12s. 1d. The initial estimates of £300,000 for the whole docks scheme proved insufficient and further acts had to be passed to raise the capital to £600,000. The Avon was diverted into the New Cut in January 1809 and on 2 April the first ships passed up the cut and entered the harbour at the Bathurst Basin.

On 1 May 1809 the docks project was certified as complete and a celebratory dinner was held on Spike Island for a thousand of the navvies, navigational engineers who had worked on the construction, at which "two oxen, roasted whole, a proportionate weight of potatoes, and six hundredweight of plum pudding" were consumed, along with a gallon of strong beer for each man. When the beer ran out a mass brawl between English and Irish labourers turned into a riot which had to be suppressed by the press gang.

Navigation

As originally envisaged, the New Cut was navigable as far as the Totterdown basin, where barges could enter the Feeder Canal and proceed up river from Netham lock to Bath, Somerset. A second lock further downstream allowed ships to enter Bathurst Basin, and hence the Floating Harbour, from the New Cut. 

Shipyards sprang up on the New Cut in the 19th century. Acraman's had a yard built in St Philip's Marsh near the Feeder Canal in 1839, where they built chain-propelled floating bridges for the Gosport–Portsmouth crossing which were too wide to pass through the floating harbour. The next year Acraman's opened a second more expansive yard in Bedminster, a well equipped yard which built a number of early steam ships. The first saw occasional shipbuilding until 1874, but the second passed to John Payne Ltd in 1862 and as the Vauxhall Yard launched dozens of small vessels directly into the New Cut, until they closed in 1925.

Packet boats operated regular services to Cardiff and Swansea from the Bathurst Basin until the 1930s, so the two bridges built across the cut below this point and before then, the Vauxhall Bridge and Ashton Swing Bridge, were originally swing bridges to allow for the passage of the steamers. The third bridge across this stretch of the cut, the Gaol Ferry Bridge, was not built until 1935, and at about the same time the two swing bridges were permanently fixed. 

Totterdown lock was in-filled and decommissioned during World War II as the authorities were worried that bombs falling on the lock would cause all of the water in the harbour to drain out. The lock providing entrance to the Bathurst Basin, and thus to the Floating Harbour, was also filled in during World War II.

No boats have regularly navigated the New Cut since the swing bridges were closed, although there are occasional inspection trips to check the state of the bridges and during the summer of 2009 special trips were run to celebrate the 200th anniversary. The cut is also regularly used by canoeists. In 1992, the Bristol Development Corporation secured an Act of Parliament to construct a new weir across the New Cut downstream of the Bathurst Basin to provide a constant height of water above that point and improve the development potential of adjacent land. Although enacted, none of the powers granted were used and the weir was never built.

References

Works cited

Bristol Harbourside
River navigations in the United Kingdom
Rivers of Bristol
History of Bristol
River Avon, Bristol